Mary Sherman Morgan (November 4, 1921 – August 4, 2004) was a U.S. rocket fuel scientist credited with the invention of the liquid fuel Hydyne in 1957, which powered the Jupiter-C rocket that boosted the United States' first satellite, Explorer 1.

Early life and education
The second youngest of six siblings, Mary Sherman was born to Michael and Dorothy Sherman on their farm in Ray, North Dakota. She grew up in a family of bullying siblings and indifferent parents who kept her out of school to work on the farm. Social services stepped in and threatened to arrest Mary's father unless he allowed her to attend school. The social worker then provided her with riding lessons and a horse to attend her one-roomed school house. In 1939, she graduated as her high school's valedictorian. She then enrolled at DeSales College in Toledo, Ohio as a chemistry major.

Career 
During Sherman's college education, the Second World War broke out. As a result of men going overseas to fight, the United States soon developed a shortage of chemists and other scientists. A local employment recruiter heard that Sherman had chemistry knowledge, and offered her a job at a factory in Sandusky, Ohio. He would not tell her what product the factory made, or what her job would be – only that she would be required to obtain a top secret security clearance. Short on money, she decided to take the job even though it would mean having to postpone her degree. The job turned out to be at the Plum Brook Ordnance Works munitions factory, charged with the responsibility of manufacturing explosives trinitrotoluene (TNT), dinitrotoluene (DNT), and pentolite. The site produced more than one billion pounds of ordnance throughout World War II.

Mary Sherman became pregnant out of wedlock in 1943, a difficult dilemma in an era when such behavior was considered extremely shameful and women were often given back-alley abortions or hidden away from their friends and family. At that time, she was living with her first cousin, Mary Hibbard, in Huron, Ohio. In 1944, she gave birth to a daughter, Mary G. Sherman, whom she later gave up for adoption to Hibbard and her husband, Irving. The child was renamed Ruth Esther.

After spending the war years designing explosives for the military, she applied for a job at North American Aviation, and was employed in their Rocketdyne Division, based in Canoga Park, California. Soon after being hired, she was promoted to the role of Theoretical Performance Specialist, which required her to mathematically calculate the expected performance of new rocket propellants. Out of 900 engineers, she was the only woman, and one of only a few without a college degree.

While working at North American Aviation, she met her future husband, George Richard Morgan, a Mechanical Engineering graduate from Caltech. Together, they had four children – George, Stephen, Monica, and Karen.

Space race era 

During the development program for the Jupiter missile, Wernher von Braun's team used modified Redstone missiles, dubbed the Jupiter C, to accelerate the rocket to orbital velocities. In order to improve the performance of the first stage, they awarded a contract to North American Aviation's Rocketdyne Division to come up with a more powerful fuel.

Morgan was assigned to lead a group of college interns at North American Aviation's Rocketdyne Division. Due to her expertise and experience, Morgan's work resulted in the birth of a new propellant, Hydyne. The standard Redstone was fueled with a 75% ethyl alcohol solution, but the Jupiter-C first stage had used Hydyne fuel, a blend of 60% unsymmetrical dimethylhydrazine (UDMH) and 40% diethylenetriamine (DETA). This was a more powerful fuel than ethyl alcohol. The first Hydyne-powered Redstone R&D flight took place on 29 November 1956, and Hydyne subsequently powered three Jupiter C nose cone test flights.

In 1957, the Soviet Union and the United States had set a goal of placing satellites into Earth orbit as part of a worldwide scientific celebration, known as the International Geophysical Year. In this endeavor, the United States' effort was called Project Vanguard. The Soviet Union successfully launched the Sputnik satellite on October 4, 1957, an event followed soon after by a very public and disastrous explosion of a Vanguard rocket. Political pressure forced U.S. politicians to allow a former German rocket scientist, Wernher von Braun, to prepare his Jupiter C rocket for an orbital flight. In the renamed launcher (now called Juno I), the propellant succeeded in launching America's first satellite, Explorer I, into orbit on January 31, 1958. After the Jupiter C and six Juno I launches, the U.S. switched to more powerful fuels.

Proposed fuel name 
As Hydyne-LOX (liquid oxygen) was the fuel combination used for the Redstone rocket, Morgan whimsically suggested naming her new fuel formulation "Bagel", since the rocket's propellant combination would then be called Bagel and Lox. However, this name was rejected by the U.S. Army.

Death and tribute 
Morgan died of chronic obstructive pulmonary disease (COPD) emphysema on August 4, 2004 at 82 years old, despite having quit her heavy smoking habit for Lent 29 years earlier. In July 2013, the BBC's online news magazine released a short video tribute to Morgan, narrated by her son, George.

Morgan was the subject of a semi-biographical stage play written by her son, George. The play, Rocket Girl, was produced by Theater Arts at California Institute of Technology (TACIT), directed by Brian Brophy, and was performed at the California Institute of Technology (Caltech) in Pasadena, California on November 17, 2008. Her son admitted that he knew surprisingly little about his mother's life and work when she died, as she worked in an industry connected to defense and national security, and was limited in what she could discuss. He had built and launched homemade rockets with friends in the Arizona desert, and as he recalled, "If I'd known how much expertise in rocketry my mother had, we could have asked her for help and saved ourselves a great deal of trouble." The play was later turned into a book by the same name.

References

External links 
 "'Rocket Girl' Celebrates Smash World Premiere at Caltech in Pasadena"
 TACIT (Theater Arts at CIT)
 

Rocket scientists
1921 births
2004 deaths
Women rocket scientists
Women inventors
Minot State University alumni
People from Williams County, North Dakota
Scientists from North Dakota
20th-century American women scientists
20th-century American chemists
21st-century American women